Fawzia Rhoda is a South African politician serving as a Member of the Northern Cape Provincial Legislature since May 2019. Rhoda is a member of the Democratic Alliance.

Political career
In the build-up to the provincial election on 8 May 2019, Rhoda was placed fourth on the Democratic Alliance's Northern Cape provincial list. She was elected as the DA won 8 seats. She was sworn in as a Member of the Northern Cape Provincial Legislature on 22 May 2019 following the election. She is the head of the DA's Bo Karoo constituency.

In 2020, Rhoda declared her candidacy for Northern Cape DA leader. The provincial congress was held on 5 December 2020. She lost to Harold McGluwa.

References

External links
Ms Fawzia Rhoda at Northern Cape Provincial Legislature

Living people
Year of birth missing (living people)
Coloured South African people
Democratic Alliance (South Africa) politicians
Members of the Northern Cape Provincial Legislature